Ernest Wilkins may refer to:

 J. Ernest Wilkins, Sr. (1894-1959), African American lawyer, labor leader and Undersecretary in the Eisenhower administration
 J. Ernest Wilkins, Jr. (1923-2011), mathematician and nuclear scientist